A list of films produced by the Bollywood film industry based in Mumbai in 1961:-

Highest-grossing films
The twenty highest-grossing films at the Indian Box Office in 1961:

A-G

H-O

P-Z

References

External links
 Bollywood films of 1961 at the Internet Movie Database
 Indian Film Songs from the Year 1961 - A look back at 1961 with a focus on Hindi film songs

1961
Lists of 1961 films by country or language
Films, Bollywood